Amy Leigh Acton (née Stearns) is an American physician and public-health researcher who served as the director of the Ohio Department of Health from 2019–2020. She played a leading role in Ohio's response to the COVID-19 pandemic.

Early life and education
Acton was born Amy Stearns and raised on the north side of Youngstown, Ohio, living "in 18 different places in a 12-year period, including in a tent when she was homeless." She described in a 2020 interview with Youngstown's WKBN having random neighbors give her and her brother breakfast "because they knew we were hungry" and also "people looking the other way, not wanting their kids to play with me because we were dirty and smelly." She described in a 2019 interview being neglected and abused while she lived with her mother following her parents' divorce. By 7th grade she was living with her father in a more stable environment, and at Liberty High School was a member of the National Honor Society and Homecoming queen.

She attended Youngstown State University and earned a medical degree from Northeast Ohio Medical University in 1990, working to pay her way through college. She completed her residency in pediatrics and preventive medicine. She earned a master's in public health from Ohio State University. She completed her residencies at Albert Einstein College of Medicine and at Nationwide Children's Hospital.

Career 
Acton taught at Ohio State University as an associate professor of public health. She worked at the Columbus Foundation as a grants manager. She was director of Project LOVE (Love Our kids, Vaccinate Early).

In 2008, while known as Amy Beech, she served as a volunteer for Barack Obama's presidential campaign by creating an email group on my.BarackObama.com called "Bexley, Yes We Can!" and publicized campaign events using Facebook.

In February 2019, Ohio governor Mike DeWine made her his final cabinet pick as director of the Department of Health. The search process was lengthy, as DeWine had been determined to have the right person in charge in a crisis. Acton was the first woman in the post. The two previous incumbents were a lawyer and a marketing director; DeWine mentioned wanting to "rethink how we approach this department".

COVID-19 pandemic

In 2020, prior to and during the COVID-19 pandemic, Acton advised Governor Mike DeWine, who became the first U.S. governor to close schools and limit gatherings to no more than 100 people, despite the fact that Ohio, at the time, had only three confirmed cases. Ohio was also the first state to temporarily close down bars and restaurants, when Ohio had fewer than 40 confirmed cases. Acton soon after estimated that Ohio's then 5 confirmed cases likely translated to 100,000 actual cases, making national news. In mid-March, she predicted cases could peak in late April to mid-May.

On March 12, she said, "This will be the thing this generation remembers." Ohio House Minority Leader Emilia Sykes called her "the real MVP of Ohio's coronavirus response." The Dayton Daily News called her "Ohio's trusted face during the pandemic."

Acton was an advocate of postponing the 2020 Ohio Democratic presidential primary, which was slated for March 17, 2020. The day before the scheduled election, Governor DeWine declared it canceled, only for a judge to rule that he did not have the authority to do so. Acton then ordered polling places closed due a public health emergency. It was later determined that the election would be conducted entirely by mail-in absentee ballot for those who had not participated in early voting. In April 2020, CNN called her "the Buckeye state's version of the straight-talking Dr. Anthony Fauci".

On April 1, Governor DeWine was reported as "quick to defer to Dr. Acton for specific questions on the virus and its spread" during daily news briefings, "reminding Ohioans that the state's decisions are driven by science."

In May 2020, a group of 35 gyms sued the Ohio Department of Health, Acton, and the Lake County General Health District over coronavirus-related health restrictions, and Lake County Court of Common Pleas Judge Eugene Lucci issued a preliminary injunction blocking the state from "imposing or enforcing penalties solely for non-compliance with the director's order" against gyms and fitness centers, "so long as they operate in compliance with all applicable safety regulations." The state appealed the decision, but Acton had signed an order permitting gyms to reopen in the interim, and a court of appeals later dismissed the case as moot. The gym reopening was part of an effort announced by Governor DeWine's administration on May 14, 2020, to reopen various economic venues with the implementation of safety protocols, including physical distancing, whenever possible, and use of face masks. Interestingly, at the time of gym reopening, it was not yet known that people with COVID-19 are contagious even before they develop symptoms.

Beginning in May 2020, protesters began showing up at Acton's home in Columbus and at press conferences. Acton was assigned a security detail. Criticism focused on her policies, but also included her politics and in at least one case, reference to her being a "Globalist," which the Anti-Defamation League of Cleveland referred to as an "antisemitic slur."

On May 20, 2020, the Ohio Senate unanimously voted against a proposal advanced by state House Republicans (and approved by the House on a nearly party-line vote) that would have limited the power of DeWine and Acton by restricting Ohio Department of Health orders to 14 days and requiring any extensions to be approved by a state joint legislative committee.

After Republican state legislators in Ohio introduced bills intended to  limit her emergency powers, she became worried about being asked to sign a health order that would violate her Hippocratic Oath. On June 11, 2020, she resigned from her position and became a chief health advisor for DeWine's administration. She was succeeded by Lance Himes as interim director. In early August 2020 she announced she had left her position as advisor to the administration.

After her resignation, she resumed working for the Columbus Foundation. On February 4, 2021, Acton stepped down from her position in the Columbus Foundation as she considered a run for the Senate in 2022 to succeed Rob Portman. However, Acton chose not to run in April 2021 while thanking Ohioans for an "outpouring of support".

In 2022, Acton was named as president and chief executive officer of RAPID 5, a nonprofit organization that is attempting to improve access to parks in Franklin County, part of the greater Columbus area.

Awards and honors
 2021: COVID Courage Award, John F. Kennedy Presidential Library and Museum
 2022: Ohio Honoree, USA TODAY's Women of the Year

Personal life 
In 2010, Acton married Eric Acton, a middle-school teacher and track coach. The couple live in Bexley and have between them six children. She is Jewish.

She was previously married to Douglas Beech, with whom she had three children.

See also 

 COVID-19 pandemic in Ohio

References

External links
 

Living people
1960s births
Year of birth missing (living people)
20th-century American physicians
21st-century American physicians
20th-century American women physicians
21st-century American women physicians
People from Greater Columbus, Ohio
People from Youngstown, Ohio
American women epidemiologists
20th-century American Jews
American public health doctors
Jewish physicians
Physicians from Ohio
Albert Einstein College of Medicine alumni
Northeast Ohio Medical University alumni
Ohio State University faculty
Youngstown State University alumni
COVID-19 pandemic in Ohio
American women academics
21st-century American Jews
Women public health doctors
Ohio State University Graduate School alumni